Ipomoea × sloteri is an allotetraploid species derived from Ipomoea × multifida.  It is a cultivated species with no natural range.

Like Ipomoea × multifida, it is known as cardinal climber.

References

sloteri
Hybrid plants